Hiren Ashok Varaiya (born 9 April 1984 in Nairobi) is a Kenyan cricketer. He is a right-handed batsman and a left arm leg spinner.

International career
He made his debut for Kenya in an ICC Intercontinental Cup game against Canada at Maple Leaf Cricket Club on 29 July 2006. He has since represented Kenya in 63 One Day Internationals and 25 Twenty20 Internationals.

Earlier in his career he represented Kenya at the Under 19 World Cup in 2002. Domestically, he plays for the Nairobi Gymkhana Club and Cricket Kenya Franchise, The Southern Stars.

In January 2018, he was named in Kenya's squad for the 2018 ICC World Cricket League Division Two tournament.

References

External links

1984 births
Living people
Kenyan cricketers
Kenya One Day International cricketers
Kenya Twenty20 International cricketers
Cricketers from Nairobi
Southern Stars cricketers